Erling Hagset Moe (born 22 July 1970) is a Norwegian professional football coach and former player who is the manager of Norwegian Eliteserien club Molde. In his active playing career, Moe played for Træff until he was aged 26 years.

Coaching career
Moe was head coach at Træff from 1999 to 2002. During Moe's period as Træff's head coach, the club played in 2. divisjon, the third-highest level in Norwegian football. The team was relegated to the 3. divisjon in his last season at the club. Moe has been a part of the coaching staff at Molde since 2005, with the exception of being head coach in third tier club Kristiansund BK for the second half of the 2011 season. On 7 August 2015, he took over as manager for the club after Tor Ole Skullerud was sacked. He was appointed as caretaker until the club found a new manager. Ole Gunnar Solskjær was appointed on 21 October 2015 and Moe went back to his former role as first team coach. Moe again took caretaker charge in December 2018, when Solskjær was appointed interim manager of Manchester United. On 29 April 2019, Moe signed as permanent head coach till the end of the 2020 season.

The 2019 season, Moe's first full season as Molde's head coach ended with Molde winning the league title with 68 points, undefeated at home and with a 14 point gap margin to runners-up Bodø/Glimt. Of Molde's four title wins in history, this was won with the biggest title-winning margin.

Personal life
Moe has stated that he is a fan of English club Coventry City.

Managerial statistics

Honours

Manager
Molde
Eliteserien: 2019, 2022
Norwegian Cup: 2021–22

Individual
Eliteserien Manager of the Year: 2022

References

1970 births
Living people
People from Molde
Norwegian footballers
SK Træff players
Kristiansund BK managers
Molde FK managers
Molde FK non-playing staff
Norwegian football managers
Association footballers not categorized by position
Eliteserien managers
Sportspeople from Møre og Romsdal